Shabeena Zikria Butt (born 14 April 1972) is a Pakistani politician who was a Member of the Provincial Assembly of the Punjab, from May 2013 to May 2018.

Early life and education
She was born on 14 April 1972 in Daska.

She earned the degree of Master of Arts in Urdu from Murray College in 1999.

Political career

She was elected to the Provincial Assembly of the Punjab as a candidate of Pakistan Muslim League (N) on a reserved seat for women in 2013 Pakistani general election.

References

Living people
Women members of the Provincial Assembly of the Punjab
Punjab MPAs 2013–2018
1972 births
Pakistan Muslim League (N) politicians
Murray College alumni
21st-century Pakistani women politicians